State Route 425 (SR 425), also known as Middle Road, is a short  east-west state highway located entirely in the city of Milan, Tennessee.

Route description

SR 425 begins on the northern edge of town at an intersection with US 45E (N 1st Street/SR 43), directly beside Milan Elementary School. It goes east through neighborhoods, where it passes by Milan Middle School, before turning southeast through more rural areas to cross over some railroad tracks and a creek before coming to an end at an intersection with US 70A/US 79 (E Vanhook Street/SR 76/SR 77). The entire route of SR 425 is a two-lane highway and acts as northeastern bypass of the city.

Major intersections

References

425
Transportation in Gibson County, Tennessee